Ahmed Abdelaziz Shobeir (born 28 September 1960) is former Egyptian goalkeeper who played for Al Ahly club & Egypt national football team. He is a former vice-president of the Egyptian Football Association, and a previous official of Egyptian national olympic team. He is also a renowned soccer T.V. commentator and show anchor. He started at Dream channel and at "AlHayat TV" for his TV show "'El Kora Ma'a Shobeir" or "The Football with Shobeir". He is currently a soccer T.V commentator at ONTime Sport  

He was also a member in the Egyptian Parliament, representing his city Tanta, in Gharbia Governorate for the term, starting 2005 and ending in 2010. He was a member in the ruling National Democratic Party that eventually got dissolved following the 2011 Egyptian Revolution that toppled Egypt's President Hosni Mubarak.

Honours
Personal 
 7th Best African Footballer by France Football 1989 
 5th Best African Footballer by France Football 1990 
 Best Egyptian goalkeeper several times 
 Best Arab goalkeeper in 1987, 1989 & 1996
President's Cup Most Valuable Player: 1993
International
 Participated in World Cup, Italy 1990 
 African cup of nations 1986, Gold Medal
 Pan Arab Games gold medal & Arab Cup title in 1992
 All-African Games gold medal in 1987

Al-Ahly 
 7 Egyptian League titles 
 5 Egypt Cup titles
 1 African Champions League title in 1987
 4 African Cup Winners' Cup titles
 1 Arab Champions League title in 1996
 1 Arab cup winners' cup title in 1995
 Played for Al Ahly Sports club, from 1980-1996

See also
 List of men's footballers with 100 or more international caps

References

Egyptian footballers
Egypt international footballers
Al Ahly SC players
Members of the House of Representatives (Egypt)
1960 births
Living people
1990 FIFA World Cup players
1988 African Cup of Nations players
1992 African Cup of Nations players
1994 African Cup of Nations players
Association football goalkeepers
National Democratic Party (Egypt) politicians
People from Tanta
FIFA Century Club
Egyptian Premier League players
African Games gold medalists for Egypt
African Games medalists in football
Competitors at the 1987 All-Africa Games